Major League Baseball 2K6 (MLB 2K6) is a 2006 Major League Baseball licensed baseball video game developed by Kush Games and published by 2K Sports. It was released for Xbox 360, Xbox, GameCube, PlayStation 2 and PlayStation Portable. This is the first time the any 2K Sports game was released for a Nintendo system since the 2K3 Series of games and the first Major League Baseball 2K game as World Series Baseball 2K3 was canceled for the system along with the 2K4/ESPN Series of games.

It has new features, such as Inside Edge, World Baseball Classic, online experience and many more. This game also features various aspects that are new to baseball games, including fans shouting, the "swing stick", showboat catches, fans catching balls, and power rankings.

In-game commentary
Jon Miller and Joe Morgan provide in game commentary while Jeanne Zelasko and Steve Physioc are the studio hosts for the fictional program, Hard Ball Central.

World Baseball Classic
For the first time this contest is included in the saga. In this way, any of the 16 participating teams of the first edition of the 2006 World Baseball Classic can be chosen.

Group A
 
 
 
 

Group B
 
 
 
 

Group C
 
 
 
 

Group D

Licensing issues
Barry Bonds does not appear in this title. However, Joe Young, a fictional left fielder, is believed to be a younger switch-hitter version of Bonds. Bonds does not appear because he is not a member of the MLB Players Association. Young appears in place of Bonds in all titles. However, there were several fictional characters such as 'Carnival Lane'.

Reception

The game received "average" reviews on all platforms according to the review aggregation website Metacritic.  In Japan, where the Xbox 360 version was ported and published by Spike on July 27, 2006, followed by the PlayStation 2 version on March 8, 2007, Famitsu gave it a score of one eight and three sevens for the former console version.

References

External links
 Official site
 
 

2006 video games
2K Sports games
GameCube games
Major League Baseball video games
MLB 2K
Multiplayer and single-player video games
PlayStation 2 games
PlayStation Portable games
Sports video games set in the United States
Take-Two Interactive games
Video games developed in the United States
Video games set in Maryland
Xbox 360 games
Xbox games